Imeretinsky Kurort railway station is a railway station of the North Caucasus Railway, a subsidiary of Russian Railways, located in Adler District of Sochi, Krasnodar Krai, Russia.

History 
The station was built for the 2014 Winter Olympics as Olympic Park and was the main transport hub of Olympic Park, the coastal cluster. During the Olympics, 26 pairs of trains departed daily from the station to Krasnaya Polyana railway station where the remainder of the Olympic events occurred.

On 15 March 2016 the station was renamed Imeretinsky Kurort.

Trains
 Tuapse — Olympic Park
 Sochi — Olympic Park
 Roza Khutor — Olympic Park

Gallery

References

Railway stations in Sochi
Railway stations in Russia opened in 2013
2014 Winter Olympics